Constantin Corduneanu (July 26, 1928 – December 26, 2018) was a Romanian-American mathematician and professor of mathematics at the University of Texas at Arlington. In 2015, he was elected a titular member of the Romanian Academy. He was a corresponding member of the Academy since 1974. A Festschrift in his honor, titled Mathematical Analysis With Applications, was published in 2018.

Corduneanu was born in Potângeni, Iași County. He received his Ph.D. in 1956 from the University of Iași with thesis Probleme globale pentru ecuațiile diferențiale de ordin I și II written under the supervision of Ilie Popa.

Books
 Almost Periodic Functions (1968)

 Integral Equations and Stability of Feedback Systems (1973)
 Integral Equations and Applications (1991)
 Functional Equations with Causal Operators (2001)
 Almost Periodic Oscillations and Waves (2009)
 Functional Differential Equations: Advances and Applications (2016)

References

External links

1928 births
2018 deaths
People from Iași County
Alexandru Ioan Cuza University alumni
Academic staff of Alexandru Ioan Cuza University
University of Texas at Arlington faculty
Titular members of the Romanian Academy
Romanian mathematicians
20th-century American mathematicians
21st-century American mathematicians
Romanian emigrants to the United States